In Norse mythology, Hnitbjörg is the mountain abode of the giant Suttungr, where he placed the mead of poetry for safekeeping under the guardianship of his daughter Gunnlodr. Odin, with the help of Suttungr's brother Baugi, drilled a hole into the mountain and thereby gained access to the mead.

Name 
The Old Norse   can be translated as "colliding rocks", which may have implied that the mountain could open and close, like those found in other folktales.

References
Faulkes, Anthony (transl.) (1987). Edda (Snorri Sturluson). Everyman. .

Locations in Norse mythology
Mythological mountains